Mariveleño may refer to:
Mariveles, Bataan
Mariveleño language